Oliwia Szmigiel (born 4 April 2003) is a Polish para badminton player who competes in international level events. She trains under the guidance of coach Małgorzata Janiaczyk in Wrocław

Achievements

World Championships 
Women's singles

Women's doubles

European Championships 
Women's singles

Women's doubles

Mixed doubles

References

Notes 

2003 births
Living people
Sportspeople from Łódź
Polish female badminton players
Polish para-badminton players